This article refers to sports broadcasting contracts in New Zealand. For a list of other countries' broadcasting rights, see Sports television broadcast contracts.

Association football

Football
From 2019 until 2023, the match aired on Sky Sport is also available on beIN Sports platforms due to Sky-beIN four-year partnership contract.

Leagues 
 A-League Men: Sky Sport
 A-League Women: Sky Sport
 J-League: OneFootball & Sky Sport
 K-League: YouTube (one match per week via COPA90)
English Premier League: Sky Sport
 English Football Leagues: beIN Sports
 FA Women's Super League: Spark Sport
 La Liga: beIN Sports
 La Liga 2: YouTube (regular season) & beIN Sports (play-offs)
 Serie A: beIN Sports
 Ligue 1: beIN Sports
 New Zealand National League: Sky Sport
 New Zealand Northern League, Central League, Southern League: New Zealand Football YouTube Channel
 Bundesliga: beIN Sports
 Belgian First Division: ESPN (only on Watch ESPN)
 Scottish Premiership: beIN Sports
 Major League Soccer: MLS Season Pass
Argentine Primera División: Fanatiz, OneFootball
 Campeonato Brasileiro: Fanatiz, OneFootball
 Indian Super League: OneFootball
 Latvian Higher League: OneFootball
 Danish Superliga: OneFootball
 Besta-deild karla: OneFootball
 Regionalliga Nord: OneFootball
 Regionalliga West: OneFootball
 Ekstraklasa: OneFootball
 Eliteserien: OneFootball
 Czech First League: OneFootball
 Swiss Super League: OneFootball
 Austrian Football Bundesliga: OneFootball
 Moldovan Super Liga: OneFootball
 Slovenian PrvaLiga: OneFootball
 Slovak Super Liga: OneFootball

Domestic cups
 English FA Cup: Sky Sport  
 FA Community Shield: Sky Sport 
 EFL Cup: beIN Sports
 Belgian Cup: ESPN (only on Watch ESPN)
 Belgian Super Cup: ESPN (only on Watch ESPN)
 Scottish Challenge Cup: beIN Sports
 Australia Cup: My Football YouTube Channel
 Chatham Cup: Sky Sport (final only), New Zealand Football YouTube Channel
 Kate Sheppard Cup: Sky Sport (final only), New Zealand Football YouTube Channel
 Kazakhstan Cup: OneFootball

International club competitions
 UEFA Champions League: Spark Sport (through 2024)
 UEFA Europa League: Spark Sport (through 2024)
 UEFA Europa Conference League: Spark Sport (through 2024)
 UEFA Super Cup: Spark Sport (through 2024)
 UEFA Women's Champions League: DAZN and YouTube
 UEFA Youth League: UEFA.tv
 OFC Champions League: OFC website
 CONMEBOL Libertadores: beIN Sports (through 2022)
 CONMEBOL Sudamericana: beIN Sports (through 2022)
 CONMEBOL Recopa: beIN Sports (through 2022)
 CONCACAF Champions League: CONCACAF YouTube Channel
 CONCACAF League: CONCACAF YouTube Channel
CAF Champions League: CAF YouTube Channel
CAF Confederation Cup: CAF YouTube Channel
CAF Super Cup: CAF YouTube Channel
AFC Champions League: Sky Sport
 FIFA Club World Cup: Sky Sport (2021 and 2022)
 International Champions Cup: beIN Sports
 Florida Cup: beIN Sports

International matches
 World Cup Qualifying: Sky Sport, Spark Sport
 AFC: Sky Sport
 CAF: CAF YouTube Channel
 CONCACAF: beIN Sports
 CONMEBOL: Sky Sport
 OFC: Sky Sport, OFC website
 UEFA: Sky Sport
 European Championship qualifying: TBA

International tournaments
 FIFA World Cups (2021 - 2023)
 Men's:
 Men's Football World Cup: Sky Sport, TVNZ (Selected matches only)
 FIFA U-20 World Cup: Sky Sport
 FIFA U-17 World Cup: Sky Sport
 Women's:
 Women's Football World Cup: Sky Sport, TVNZ (Selected matches only)
 FIFA U-20 Women's World Cup: Sky Sport
 FIFA U-17 Women's World Cup: Sky Sport
 UEFA
 UEFA Euro 2024: Spark Sport
 UEFA Women's Euro 2022: UEFA.tv
 UEFA Nations League: Sky Sport
 2019 UEFA European Under-21 Championship: UEFA.tv
 2019 UEFA European Under-19 Championship: UEFA.tv
 2019 UEFA Women's Under-19 Championship: UEFA.tv
 2019 UEFA European Under-17 Championship: YouTube
 2019 UEFA Women's Under-17 Championship: YouTube
 Copa America 2024: TBA
CONCACAF Gold Cup 2023: TBA
Asian Cup 2023: Sky Sport
African Cup of Nations 2023: beIN Sports
 WAFU Nations Cup: ESPN
 Toulon Tournament: ESPN

Beach soccer 

 FIFA Beach Soccer World Cup: Sky Sport (2019 and 2021)

Futsal

International tournaments 

 FIFA Futsal World Cup: Sky Sport
 UEFA Futsal Euro: UEFA.tv
 UEFA Under-19 Futsal Euro: UEFA.tv
 UEFA Women's Futsal Euro: UEFA.tv (final four only)

International club competitions 
 UEFA Futsal Champions League: UEFA.tv (final four only)

Athletics
 IAAF Golden League:
 Sky Sport:  Highlights, plus some live coverage.
 Grenada Invitational: ESPN

Australian rules football
 Australian Football League
Sky Sport: One live game per week, plus weekly highlights.
 AFL Women's
Sky Sport: One live game per week, plus weekly highlights.

Badminton 

 BWF: OVO Mobile (2019–2021)

Baseball

 Major League Baseball (Regular season, Playoffs and World Series): ESPN.
 College baseball: ESPN
 Little League World Series: ESPN
 World Baseball Classic: ESPN

Basketball
 National Basketball League: Sky Sport
 National Basketball League (Australia):
 Sky Sport has one game every Thursday night; live coverage of Semifinal, and Grand Final.
 National Basketball Association: ESPN, NBA TV International
 Women's National Basketball Association: ESPN
 College basketball: ESPN
 NBA Summer League: ESPN
 NBA G League: ESPN
 The Basketball Tournament: ESPN
 Basketball Africa League: ESPN

Cricket
 New Zealand Cricket - Home Domestic and International Cricket:
 Spark Sport (2020-2023), TVNZ (2023-2026)
 Home internationals involving the New Zealand men's and women's cricket teams
 Men's Super Smash and Women's Super Smash 
 The Ford Trophy final
 Limited free-to-air rights: TVNZ (2020-2023):  Live coverage of the first T20 International of a home series involving the New Zealand men's and women's cricket teams. Live coverage of most matches from the Super Smash domestic competitions.
 Overseas cricket:
 Sky Sport: 
 International fixtures - Cricket Australia, BCCI (India), Cricket South Africa, Cricket West Indies and Pakistan Cricket Board.
 Australian domestic competitions: Sheffield Shield, One-Day Cup, Women's National Cricket League, Big Bash League and Women's Big Bash League.
 Indian Premier League, Caribbean Premier League, Super50 Cup and Pakistan Super League.
 Prime:  Highlights and selected live coverage.  Free to air partner, showing what Sky allocates to it.
 Spark Sport (2020-2023)
 England and Wales Cricket Board
 Home internationals
 The Hundred
 Vitality Blast
 Royal London One-Day Cup final
 New Zealand cricket team in Bangladesh in 2021–22.
 ICC
 Sky Sport: All major ICC events live.
 Prime: Live coverage of a selection matches involving the New Zealand cricket team. Highlights of other events or matches.
 Spark Sport: Highlights of all major ICC events.

Cycling
 Tour de France: Sky Sport

Esports
 Madden Club Championship: ESPN
 Madden Bowl: ESPN

Extreme Sports
 X Games: ESPN

Field hockey
Men's and Women's Hockey World Cups: Spark Sport
Men's and Women's Hockey Pro Leagues: Spark Sport

Golf
 Australian Open: Spark Sport (2019-2020)
 The Open Championship: Sky Sport
 Ryder Cup: Sky Sport
 European Tour: Sky Sport
 PGA Tour: Sky Sport
 U.S. Open: Sky Sport
 U.S. Masters: Sky Sport
 New Zealand PGA Championship: TV3
 World Golf Championships : Sky Sport
 World Cup : Sky Sport
 New Zealand Open : Sky Sport
 LPGA Tour : SKY Sport (New Zealand)
 Evian Masters : Sky Sport (New Zealand)

Gridiron football
 National Football League:
 ESPN: NFL Network games, three Sunday afternoon games, Thursday Night Football, Sunday Night Football and Monday Night Football. All play-off games.
 Sky Sport: One live game every Monday night in HD (where available)
 College football: ESPN
 XFL: ESPN

Horse-racing

 Kentucky Derby: ESPN
 Preakness Stakes: ESPN
 Belmont Stakes: ESPN
 All New Zealand domestic race meetings: Trackside
 All international race meetings: Trackside
 Selected thoroughbred and harness meets: Prime
 Melbourne Cup: Trackside, TVNZ 
 Melbourne Spring Racing Carnival: Trackside

Ice Hockey
 National Hockey League: ESPN
 Premier Hockey Federation: ESPN
 Swedish Hockey League: ESPN

Lacrosse
 Major League Lacrosse: ESPN

Boxing
Dream Boxing: DAZN: October 2022 to October 2025, all fights

Kickboxing
King of Kings: DAZN: October 2022 to October 2025, all fights
King in the Ring: TVNZ

Mixed Martial Arts
 Bushido MMA: DAZN: October 2022 to October 2025, all fights
 Ultimate Fighting Championship: ESPN  (Fight Night and PPV preliminaries), Sky Arena and Spark Sport (PPVs)
 ONE Championship: Spark Sport

Motor racing
 FIA Formula One: Sky Sport
 Porsche Supercup: Sky Sport
 Formula 2: Sky Sport 
 Formula 3: Sky Sport
 Formula E: Sky Sport (live), Three (highlights) 
 IndyCar Series: Sky Sport
 AMA Supercross Championship: ESPN
 Australian Supercars Championship: Sky Sport (Includes support categories)
 Dunlop Super2 Series: Sky Sport (Live with Supercars Championship) Three (Delayed)
 NZ Touring Cars Championship: Three (delayed coverage)
 DTM: Spark Sport (live),  Three (highlights)
 WTCC: Three (highlights)
 World Rally Championship: Spark Sport
 World Rallycross Championship: Spark Sport
 MotoGP: Spark Sport
 Superbike World Championship: Sky Sport
 Speedway Grand Prix: Sky Sport (delayed coverage)
 NASCAR
 BTCC:Three (delayed coverage)
W Series: Sky Sport

Multi-discipline events
 Commonwealth Games: TVNZ (2018); Sky Sport and Prime (2022 and 2026)
 Summer Olympics: Sky Sport and TVNZ (2020)
 Winter Olympics: Sky Sport and Prime
 Paralympics Games: TVNZ
 Special Olympics World Games: ESPN

Netball
 ANZ Premiership:
Sky Sport (live coverage of all games, elimination final and grand final)
 2019 Netball World Cup:
Sky Sport
 International Netball:
Sky Sport (live coverage)
 National Netball League:
Sky Sport (live coverage of all games)
 Suncorp Super Netball:
Spark Sport (live coverage of all games)

Poker
 World Series of Poker: ESPN

Rowing
 World Rowing Championships: Sky Sport
 Rowing World Cup: Sky Sport

Rugby league
 National Rugby League:
 Sky Sport: Live coverage of all games
 Prime: Delayed coverage of Warriors games
 New South Wales Cup:
 Sky Sport: All Warriors home games live, plus any games available from Fox Sports
  NZRL National Premiership
 Sky Sport
 State of Origin:
 Sky Sport: Live Coverage
 Prime: Delayed coverage
 Super League:
 Sky Sport
 Rugby League Challenge Cup:
 Sky Sport
 Four Nations:
Sky Sport: Live Coverage
 Prime: Delayed coverage of selected games

Rugby union
 Rugby World Cup: Sky Sport
 The Rugby Championship:
Sky Sport: Live coverage of all games
Prime: Delayed coverage of All Blacks tests
 Super Rugby:
Sky Sport: live coverage of all games
Prime: Delayed coverage of one game per weekend on Saturday Night. They also show highlights of all games and one full game.
 College 1st XV coverage
Sky Sport: Live and delayed coverage and highlights of televised matches during the week.
 Currie Cup: Sky Sport
 European Rugby Champions Cup: Spark Sport
 National Provincial Championship:
Sky Sport: Live coverage of all games
Prime: Live and delayed coverage of selected games.
 Six Nations Championship: Sky Sport
 Gallagher Premiership: Sky Sport

Softball
Men's Softball World Championship: Whakaata Māori

Swimming
 FINA World Aquatics Championships: Sky Sport

Tennis
 Australian Open: Sky Sport
 French Open: Sky Sport
 The Championships, Wimbledon: Sky Sport
 U.S. Open: Spark Sport
 ATP Finals: Sky Sport 
 ATP Tour Masters 1000: Sky Sport
 ATP Tour 500: Sky Sport
 Next Generation ATP Finals: Sky Sport
 WTA Tour: Spark Sport
 ASB Classic: Sky Sport
 Laver Cup: Sky Sport
Davis Cup: Sky Sport
Fed Cup: Sky Sport

References

Sports television in New Zealand
New Zealand